PNC Bank Building is a high-rise skyscraper building located at 800 17th Street NW, Washington, D.C., United States. The building broke ground in 2008, and was completed in 2010. The building serves as an office building for PNC Financial Services, and serves as the regional headquarters for PNC Financial Services. The architect of the building is Gensler, who designed the postmodern design of the building. The developer of the building is PNC/Vornado.

See also
List of tallest buildings in Washington, D.C.

References

External links

Skyscraper office buildings in Washington, D.C.

Gensler buildings
Office buildings completed in 2010
2010 establishments in Washington, D.C.